Albert Smith (Q2 1863 – date of death unknown) was an English cricketer active in first-class cricket in 1894, making two appearances.

Born at Mexborough, Yorkshire, Smith was a slow left-arm orthodox bowler who made his debut in first-class cricket when he was selected to play for the Liverpool and District cricket team against Yorkshire at Aigburth. His second appearance of 1894 came against Cambridge University, also at Aigburth. He scored a total of 38 runs in his two matches, with a highest score of 21. With the ball he took 7 wickets, which came at an average of 24.28, with best figures of 4/57.  He later made two appearances for Cheshire in the 1895 Minor Counties Championship against Staffordshire and Worcestershire.

References

Albert Smith at CricketArchive

1863 births
People from Mexborough
Cricketers from Doncaster
English cricketers
Liverpool and District cricketers
Cheshire cricketers
Year of death missing
English cricketers of 1890 to 1918